Coosa Bald National Scenic Area is a federally designated National Scenic Area within Chattahoochee National Forest in northern Georgia, USA. The  scenic area is administered by the U.S. Forest Service. The scenic area was established at the same time as the nearby Ed Jenkins National Recreation Area.

The National Scenic Area was established by Public Law 102-217, known as the "Chattahoochee National Forest Protection Act" of 1991,

References

National scenic areas
Protected areas of Georgia (U.S. state)
Protected areas established in 1991
1991 establishments in Georgia (U.S. state)